22nd Rifle Division can refer to:

 22nd Guards Rifle Division
 22nd Motor Rifle Division NKVD
 40th Naval Infantry Brigade, formerly the 22nd Rifle Division